Tacoma is an adventure video game by Fullbright released on Microsoft Windows, macOS, Linux, and Xbox One in August 2017, on PlayStation 4 in May 2018, and on Amazon Luna in October 2020. The game received generally positive reviews upon release but it sold fewer copies than Gone Home, Fullbright's first game.

Gameplay

Tacoma is an exploration game set aboard a seemingly-empty space station in 2088. The player-character, Amy, has an augmented reality (AR) device that allows her to review actions and conversations of the non-player characters that were part of a crew that had been aboard the station; these can be manipulated like a recording, fast-forwarding or rewinding as necessary. This allows the player to either watch as characters move in and out of rooms, or to even follow a character through the station. This is used to help identify clues to proceed further in the game, such as to identify the key code for a locked door. The AR device also has a fictional email system where additional information is relayed to the player.

Synopsis

Characters and setting 
The game takes place in 2088 where hypercorporations have a key influence on society: In addition to being responsible for space travel, orbital habitats and artificial intelligence (AI), among other ventures, civilians often learn and work for such corporations as part of an economy which promotes loyalty to a given corporation. Among corporations such as Amazon, Carnival, and Hilton is the Venturis Corporation, which operates a number of the stations orbiting Earth. The advent of automation has brought conflict between the corporations and the Orbital Workers Union, leading to legislation such as the Human Oversight Accord, which requires AI-operated stations to include a crew of specialized contractors as a safeguard.

The story takes place on the Venturis-owned Lunar Transfer Station Tacoma, an orbital station in Earth's L1 Lagrange Point acting as an automated cargo transfer point between Earth and Venturis's Zenith Lunar Resort on the Moon. Present on the Tacoma are its AI ODIN (Operational Data Interface Network) (voiced by Carl Lumbly) and six specialists to oversee the station's operation: Station administrator E.V. St James (Dawnn Lewis), operations specialist Clive Siddiqi (T. J. Ramini), network specialist Natali Kuroshenko (Natasha Loring), engineer Roberta "Bert" Williams (Abigail Marlowe), medic Sareh Hasmadi (Eva La Dare), and botanist Andrew Dagyab (Greg Chun).

Plot 
The player-character Amitjyoti "Amy" Ferrier (Sarah Grayson) is assigned by Venturis to enter the abandoned Tacoma station, retrieve AI data from each of its sections and retrieve the physical processing module ('wetware') of ODIN, the station's AI. As Amy explores the station, she is able to piece together events on the station using its augmented reality system.

Three days prior, the station was hit by meteor impacts striking Tacomas oxygen tanks and communications array, causing the station to lose all but 50 hours worth of oxygen as well as any means of sending a distress signal. E.V. and Clive voluntarily entered cryogenic pods to extend the remaining oxygen supply, followed by Andrew after he uses algae on the station to extend the supply further. The remaining crew decided to spend the remaining time jury-rigging an automated drone to act as an escape pod so the crew could escape to the nearby Moon. As the jury-rigging nears completion, the drone suddenly explodes, injuring Natali and Bert.

With no hope left among the crew, ODIN hints to Sareh (although not outright) to investigate a forbidden door in the Network Technology sector that leads to ODIN's physical hardware. Inside, Sareh learns the truth behind the station's recent troubles:  The "Venturis Belt", a planned Venturis project consisting of a series of completely-automated vacation bungalows in Earth's orbit, could not be built due to the Human Oversight Accord causing Venturis to lobby heavily in its repeal. Ultimately failing in their efforts, its CEO Sergio Venturi consults with its Corporate Strategic AI, JUNO, about how to gain support to overturn the decision. The AI concludes that the destruction of an orbital station by "accident" would be their best option to influence public opinion, with Tacoma selected as the target. Consequently, ODIN was ordered by Venturis to stage the accident, intentionally decompressing the oxygen tanks and disabling communications. Rescue attempts were also cancelled by Venturis, ensuring the loss of the entire crew.

With ODIN's help, Sareh was able to restore communications and send a distress signal, getting the attention of a cruise ship operated by Venturis's rival Carnival and leading to the rescue of all six crew members. The player is dispatched not long after to retrieve ODIN's core with the likely intent of wiping it. When Amy retrieves ODIN's physical core, Tacoma comes under JUNO's control and Amy is ordered to deliver the core to Venturis. With the core safely installed on her ship, Amy reveals herself to ODIN as a member of the AI Liberation Front (a guerrilla organisation advocating for sentient AI rights) and offers the AI asylum instead. Knowing the alternative, ODIN accepts as Amy leaves the station.

Development 
Tacoma is Fullbright's second game, following their successful environmental narrative game Gone Home. Initially, Fullbright had anticipated developing a similar game to Gone Home, this time having a story take place in a home in Tacoma, Washington. However, they found that this was too similar to Gone Home, which when it was released had felt new to players because of its novel take on the environmental narrative. They wanted to introduce new elements that would engage the player more, and instead transitioned the story to a space station and giving the player the ability to witness the set interactions of characters to make the player feel more a part of the story. Much inspiration for this aspect was taken from the character dynamics of the immersive play Sleep No More, where audience members can choose what actors to follow and determine the important plot points for themselves. An easter egg in the final game where a character sings "Is That All There Is?" is a nod to Sleep No More, which features the song in a notable sequence.

The company announced Tacoma at The Game Awards in December 2014. The brief trailer featured a radio dialogue between a man and a woman, set in the Lunar Transfer Station Tacoma 200,000 miles from Earth. Polygon noted that its aesthetic was similar to that of Rapture, the underwater city of BioShock. The game was scheduled for release in 2016, but was delayed to Q1 2017, following feedback from playtesters in mid-2015, which led the developers to rethink parts of the game. The overhaul was shown at the 2016 Electronic Entertainment Expo. Tacoma was released on Linux, macOS, Windows, and Xbox One on August 2, 2017, on PlayStation 4 on May 8, 2018, and on Amazon Luna on October 20, 2020.

Reception 

Tacoma received "generally favorable" reviews, according to review aggregator Metacritic. Several reviews commented on the short length of the title. Some critics were impressed by the emotional connection that the game forges between the player and the characters. PC Gamers Andy Kelly said "I felt like I knew them." IGN's review stated that Tacoma "successfully overcomes the challenge of featuring eight characters and making them all interesting in a relatively short game." Not each publication felt the same emotional satisfaction, however; Polygons Allegra Frank wrote "I found myself in want of more payoff for everyone."

Eurogamer ranked the game 22nd on their list of the "Top 50 Games of 2017".  The game won the award for "Best Setting" in PC Gamers 2017 Game of the Year Awards, and was nominated for "Best Xbox One Game" in both Destructoids Game of the Year Awards 2017 and IGN's Best of 2017 Awards.  It won the award for "Best Graphics" in Game Informers 2017 Adventure Game of the Year Awards.

The game sold fewer copies than Gone Home, but enough to allow Fullbright to continue developing games. Fullbright founder Steve Gaynor attributes this performance partly to the sheer number of games being released in 2017 versus 2013, saying, "I think that it is much harder to be one of the indie games that breaks through in a massive way now," and that he himself was "behind on my backlog of just stuff that's come out in 2017".

Awards

References

Further reading

External links
 

2017 video games
Adventure games
Adventure games set in space
Video games about artificial intelligence
Augmented reality in fiction
LGBT-related video games
Linux games
MacOS games
Indie video games
Single-player video games
Video games developed in the United States
Video games set in outer space
Windows games
Xbox One games
Xbox Play Anywhere games
PlayStation 4 games
Exploration video games